The women's discus throw event at the 2001 Summer Universiade was held at the Workers Stadium in Beijing, China on 29 and 30 September.

Medalists

Results

Qualification

Final

References

Athletics at the 2001 Summer Universiade
2001 in women's athletics
2001